Tobuo Bhalobashi is a Bangladeshi Bengali-language film. It is directed by Montazur Rahman Akbar. It stars Mahiya Mahi, Bappy Chowdhury, Amit Hasan (villain), Sohel Rana, Diti, Asif Iqbal, and many more.

Plot
Completing graduation, before taking the charge of the family business, Sangram, an honest and active protester against injustice goes to Gazipur at his friend's wedding party. At that party, he is introduced to a naughty girl Sunayana. He is in love with Sunayana but he doesn't propose to her for scaring of her father. One day when Sunayana's father became ill, Sangram has to go to bring some medicine while hartal is running that was called by a terrorist Lal. Sangram looks over the hartal, involves in conflict with terrorist Lal. Lal wants to pay back.

Cast
 Mahiya Mahi as Sunoyna
 Bappy Chowdhury as Songram
 Amit Hasan as Lal
 Sohel Rana as Rashid Chowdhury
 Diti as Songram's mother
 Mizu Ahmed as Gazi Marhaba
 Rehana Jolly as Momota
 Gulshan Ara Ahmed as Ishana's mother
 Asif Iqbal
 Boby as Hayder
 Subrata as Farid
 Shah Alam Kiron as Kironpuri

Soundtrack
"Elomelo Shomoy" - Kona
"Ek Sonali Kabin" - Kona And Kishor
"Hawa A Hawa" - Mila And Saymon
"Biyar O Dhol" - Kona, Razib, Kumar Bishwajit, Samina Chowdhury
"Tumi Acho Nojore Nojore" - Nancy And Shafiq Tuhin
"Elomelo Shomoy" (reprise) - Kona

Critical response
Film critic Nabeel Onusurjo reviewed the film for Bdnews24.com.

References

External links
 http://www.bmdb.com.bd/movie/213/

2013 films
Bengali-language Bangladeshi films
Films scored by Shawkat Ali Emon
Films scored by Shafiq Tuhin
2010s Bengali-language films
Jaaz Multimedia films